Yōko Maki may refer to:

Yōko Maki (artist) (born 1981), Japanese manga artist
Yōko Maki (actress) (born 1982), Japanese actress

See also
Maki (disambiguation)